This is a list of development studios owned by Sega, a Japanese video game developer and publisher based in Tokyo, Japan. Accompanied with the list is their history of game development. Also included are the companies that Sega has acquired over the years. For a full list of games developed and published by Sega, see List of Sega video games, List of Sega mobile games and List of Sega arcade games.

1960–1989 
During the early 1960s, Sega had around 40 developers. One of the developers was Hisashi Suzuki who previously was in charge of autodesign at Tokyu Kogyu Kurogane, he changed jobs to Sega in 1964, which then was called Nihon Goraku Bussan. As the company grew, Suzuki recalls about eight departments dedicated to development, which were arcades, arcade cabinets and consumer products. Sega rarely outsourced their games, much like Namco and Taito, as it was hard to find other companies that could do design, manufacturing, marketing and maintenance all at once.

Another early developer was Hideki Sato, who joined 1971. He recalls, when he joined Sega, they were making pinball tables, electro-mechanical games, however mainly sold jukeboxes. Hideki Sato was part of a development team that mainly had around 20 people, and they were engaged in pinball tables and electro-mechanical games. Sato was assigned to the team that made pinball tables, which were imported from America, but had modifications done to them so they would be more fun.

Sega at that time was owned by a foreign company and led by David Rosen. He brought Pong from Atari to the Japanese offices, which impressed Sato. The developers quickly researched how games with TV's were made, and thus Sega quickly brought its first video game to market with Pong Tron in 1973. Hayao Nakayama, who later became president, joined Sega after the purchase of game distribution company Esco Trading. According to Sato, Nakayama was more than just a manager, he had helpful input into games like Monaco GP as well, as he firmly understood the business of games and that the development division is the most important part of a company. Sega learned a lot about programming and software after purchasing Gremlin Industries in 1980, which was located in San Diego. It was because of this purchase that Sega began using printed circuit boards for games. Sega's first arcade board was the System 1, which debuted with Star Jacker. It was developed by Sato and was their first standardized arcade board, before then each game had individually costumized hardware. Home computers was an interest of Nakayama, the MSX was becoming popular. So a small team of three people were involved in creating the SC-3000. The game capabilities of it were turned into the SG-1000, the first home console of Sega, which was made after Sega learned about Nintendo's plans to release the Famicom. At the same time the System 2 arcade hardware was developed, this time by an engineer called Hiroshi Yagi. System 2 was also capable of displaying multiple screens which was used in a horse racing medal game called Super Derby, which was useful for the development of the Sega Game Gear. The new console Sega Mark III, overseas called Sega Master System, was made with the purpose that System 1 and 2 arcade games could easily be ported. It was thought that spreading home hardware while also developing more powerful arcade hardware would make players go to an actual arcade, and that this would create a virtous cycle. Around the same time, the Motorola 68000 was used in arcades, and it was modified to suit home consoles, which resulted in the Mega Drive in 1988. According to Sato this was when Sega began sharing the know-how between arcade and home hardware. Sega also increased the amount of female customers in arcades with the UFO Catcher, an improved type of crane game that existed before, and acquiring the Tetris license for arcades.

In terms of software developers, Yoji Ishii joined 1978, and was involved in sound engineering on various titles like Monaco GP and Zaxxon, before being involved in the planning section working on early arcade titles like Up'n Down, Sindbad Mystery, Flicky, Teddy Boy Blues and Fantasy Zone. He also worked with Yu Suzuki on his titles later on, and then moved on to management duties. Yu Suzuki joined in 1984, and after a year of doing chores and developing Champion Boxing, he was developing big sensory cabinet games like Hang-On, Space Harrier, OutRun and After Burner. Each took about six months. According to Hisashi Suzuki, it was the environment of being able to do everything in-house that made these kind of cabinets possible.  Yuji Naka joined the company alongside Hiroshi Kawaguchi and was part of the team that developed software for the SC-3000, the PC Division, which according to Naka had about 15 developers.  Only some games were outsourced to Compile, all the software was done in-house. Software developers were only around 50 people at most, 20 or 30 for hardware-related matters. The pace of software development was to develop one game every 1 to 2 months, Yuji Naka recalls bragging with Yu Suzuki who worked more overtime, and it was usual to work at weekends too, as they were essentially living at the company. Mark Cerny, the only foreigner in development, recalls the company was very much a sweatshop, saying "It's 1 programmer, 1 artist, 3 months. That's a game. The tokyo group made about 40 games, from which about only 2 could be played and enjoyed". Yuji Naka already had a reputation as a great programmer early on. Naka had a desire to make games that were not possible on Nintendo hardware, or to port arcade games from more powerful hardware. Examples of this include the 3D Dungeons of Phantasy Star, the Mark III version of Hokuto no Ken (overseas known as Black Belt) or ports of the arcade games Space Harrier, Super Thunder Blade and the Capcom game Ghosts'n Goblins. However it was the development plan "a game to beat Mario" that caught the attention of a superior of Naka, which started the development of Sonic the Hedgehog. The Genesis generally marked a turning point were more original software for consoles began development such as Alex Kidd in the Enchanted Castle, The Revenge of Shinobi, Phantasy Star II and Sword of Vermillion.

Early development

1983–1989

1990–1999 
Yu Suzuki was the first to branch out with his own studio called Studio 128, and after that many more departments followed, all of which had their roots in R&D1. Hisao Oguchi recalls up to six departments and according to him the environment was extremely competitive. Hisashi Suzuki always asked "what's new?" and constantly asked to be "first in the world" when looking at game pitches. Nakayama was very harsh on who makes money and who doesn't in the arcades, and thus supported developers like Yu Suzuki, who created many hits. Mandate came from Nakayama to develop a title better than Street Fighter II, however also Namco was ahead in the arcade game area with Winning Run. To catch up, Yu Suzuki purchased SGI IRIS workstations from Silicon Valley to develop Virtua Racing, which lead to Virtua Fighter, which was exactly what Nakayama was looking for. In collaboration with GE, the Sega Model 2 and Sega Model 3 arcade hardware was made possible, and produced further games with very advanced graphics and also multiplayer titles were made possible with Virtua Striker and SpikeOut. At the time, Sega was involved with Vivendi and Universal on Gameworks arcades, and thus had a connection to Steven Spielberg, who visited the Sega offices and saw the prototype of Shenmue, which was something that he was very impressed with. This caused Sega management to further support it. However, according to Hisashi Suzuki this meant Yu Suzuki leaving the arcade business to develop console projects, and no one was able to tame Yu Suzuki, which meants that the project went out of control. Shenmue was previously for the Sega Saturn. AM2 developed an development environment for the Sega Saturn, called the Sega Graphic Library, due to the Sega Saturn being difficult to make games for.

On the opposite trend, Hisao Oguchi of AM3 was aiming to make games for couples and as another theme to release game that were "cool" rather than otaku like. AM3 developer Mie Kumagai who later garnered attention later on as a female manager of a development department shared this sentiment as "the future of arcades cannot be boys only". Rail Chase, Jurassic Park, Jambo! Safari, Top Skater and a variety of sports games such as Virtua Tennis, were part of this direction. However, most of the income at arcades in Japan came from core players rather than casuals. AM5 was established which at first made kiddie rides with monitors, which were successful but went on to make large scale attractions, one of which was the VR-1, an early example of Virtual Reality.

Masao Yoshimoto, who joined in 1987, and developed the R-360 among many other arcade cabinets, recalled this period as the golden age of Sega, when both advanced graphics and big motion sensitive cabinets such as the ones for Manx TT Superbike and WaveRunner were made possible.

Putting to use what Naka learned by porting Ghost'n Goblins to the Genesis, he went on to develop Sonic the Hedgehog, along with artist Naoto Oshima and designer Hirokazu Yasuhara. Sonic had a much bigger development period than other Sega games at the time, with Mark Cerny recalling it having 10 months development time, and three core developers instead of two. Yuji Naka himself worked on it for one year and a half, and did not work on any other games in the meantime, in contrast to the frequent releases he had before. Sega of America marketing strategies made Sonic the Hedgehog a success for Sega, causing them to have 61% market share in North America with their Genesis consoles.  Yuji Naka quit Sega due to him feeling that he did not get enough appreciation for his work on Sonic, but then was invited by Mark Cerny to join his development group, the Sega Technical Institute, and he along with 10 other developers went to Sega of America and developed the sequels Sonic 2, Sonic 3 and Sonic & Knuckles. In addition to STI, Sega Interactive, Sega Midwest Studio and Sega Multimedia Studio were other studios that Sega of America established at this time. Japanese game development also expanded externally with SIMS, which was previously Sanritsu, and Sonic Software Planning! which often worked with Climax Entertainment. Other worldwide successes developed by the Japanese group were Streets of Rage II and Phantasy Star IV which were appreciated in all parts of the world.

The Sega CD was developed to get ahead in Japan, as the PC Engine was more popular and also had a CD drive. Sega was able to increase performance and storage, and according to hardware developer Masami Ishikawa, was able to release a nice RPG on it. RPG's were the most popular in Japan, and the RPG's from Game Arts were an important asset for Sega, but those games as well as Sega's own Shining and Phantasy Star series were unable to compete with Dragon Quest, Final Fantasy and Ys I&II. The most famous title for the Sega CD, was Sonic CD, which was developed in Japan without the involvement of Yuji Naka, although ideas were exchanged. It was mainly developed by Naoto Oshima along with much staff that was gathered from all over Sega, many of them young.

Being behind in Japan, motivated Sega to put a lot of resources into the Sega Saturn. The development team of the Saturn was the same that developed by System 32 arcade board. Sato regrets that he did not go with the Model 1 arcade hardware as a base, as he was too concerned of leaving all the developers behind that were focused on sprites rather than 3D, which were the majority of developers. Sega supported five different console hardware, with the first and second department focusing on Sega Saturn, the third and fourth on the Genesis as well as add-ons 32X and Sega CD, a fifth development department existed for Game Gear development and a sixth department existed for RPG's. Also a department of about 40 people dedicated to porting games to PC was established, as Windows 95 became widespread in Japan. Including overseas staff and arcade developers, over 1000 developers were engaged in development. Sega Saturn projects were much larger in comparison to other teams at the time. An early large project was Panzer Dragoon as about 30 people were involved. Yoji Ishii was transferred from the arcade to console development in 1993, and many others from the arcades followed, making it up to several hundred developers involved in Sega Saturn development. Early on, the 3D capabilities were not shown off well with a lacking port of Daytona USA as well Clockwork Knights, which was mainly 2D. By 1995, the Saturn could compete very well with ports of Virtua Fighter 2, Virtua Cop and Sega Rally Championship. Particularly Virtua Fighter 2 became the first million-seller for Sega in Japan. RPG's like Sakura Wars, Magic Knight Rayearth and Dragon Force, anime license games such as Neon Genesis Evangelion and sports games also did very well in Japan. Yuji Naka also gone back to Japan and wanted to develop 3D games after being sent videotapes of the games that Yu Suzuki was developing. Naka had no desire to develop for the Sega 32X, which was mainly spearheaded by Sega of America. Game producer Takayuki Kawagoe called the line-up quite weak, as games like Knuckles Chaotix were previously just 16-bit titles, but praised the original titles such as Metal Head. Yuji Naka, along with Naoto Oshima developed NiGHTS Into Dreams and Burning Rangers, with the latter not having much involvement from Naka. Much like how Sonic was made to succeed in America, NiGHTS was made to succeed in Europe, although that was the desire by the development team, rather than marketing. According to manager Hisashi Suzuki, the turning point was the release of Final Fantasy VII. It and the influence of Dragon Quest was far too great for Sega to overcome. It did not only influence the fortune of Sega in console development, but also the relevancy of arcades was put into question as well.

Isao Okawa, the chairman of CSK, the parent company of Sega, said "let's try one more time", in regard to Sega hardware. Sonic Adventure, Virtua Fighter 3 and Shenmue moved from Saturn to the new Dreamcast and in-house development for Sega Saturn completely halted in 1998. The NAOMI arcade hardware was developed to make porting titles to the Dreamcast without loss of quality. Therefore, home and arcade hardware became equal. Isao Okawa personally instructed Yuji Naka, to create an online game for the new Dreamcast. Naka released Chu Chu Rocket as a test for the online capabilities for the Dreamcast. The turnover of staff was the largest at Sega since 1986, as staff began to establish new companies such as Artoon. Visual Concepts was acquired by Sega of America to develop sports titles, while No Cliche was established by Sega Europe.

1990–1995

1996–1999

2000–2004 
Sega officially announced the withdrawal of hardware on January 31, 2001, and to develop games for other hardware. Sega already announced that they will transition to an "architectural platform holder" in November 2000 which according to Sato was a roundabout of saying that they have left hardware. In addition, the development team was split off into separate companies in April 21 of 2000, which were about ten different ones. Each headed by their own president, with their own philosophies and they were responsible for their own finances. All the different companies also supported different consoles in addition to the Dreamcast, with the Xbox being supported by WOW Entertainment, Hitmaker and Smilebit, the Gamecube being supported by Sonic Team and Amusement Vision and the PlayStation 2 being supported by Overworks, AM2, United Game Artists and Smilebit. Tetsuya Mizuguchi, head of United Game Artist, saw this initially as a move of Sega of being more similar to Hollywood, where distribution and development were becoming more and more separated. Toshihiro Nagoshi recalls this period as labour of love from Sega, "teaching the creatives the way of managing a business". Hisao Oguchi who lead the Hitmaker studio had a suspicion that this structure was made to separate the creators who were able to make profit and the ones who didn't, as they were many projects that didn't hit the mark, and at one point Sega was hiring 200 or more developers a year, effecting costs that were no longer manageable. In the end, Yuji Naka, was considered to be the leader in home software development, and Oguchi the leader of arcade development. Yuji Naka had the Sonic games and released Phantasy Star Online, which won several awards within the Japanese game industry. Oguchi was attributed the successful card arcade games in Japan that Sega was developing at the time, which started with Derby Owners Club and continued with World Club Champion Football, Mushiking: The King of Beetles and Love & Berry: Dress up and Dance!. Particularly Mushiking and Love & Berry supported Sega with very strong sales in the Japanese market, although Oguchi was not involved with those titles. Toshihiro Nagoshi, who was not very involved with Dreamcast games, landed a hit with Super Monkey Ball on the Nintendo Gamecube and was involved with Nintendo management when dealing with them for the development of F-Zero GX. This also made him very favourable for a management position within Sega. However, Nagoshi himself saw himself as sort of an in-between of Oguchi and Naka, and not on the same level as them. Sega did not make anymore custom hardware on its own after the Sega Hikaru arcade board in 2001, however many tenured engineers continued to work on Sega arcade technologies such as card systems, internet infrastructure and future arcade boards such as the Chihiro.

In 2003, Oguchi became president of Sega, and multiple studios were merged into another, as several developers left Sega during the era of spunning off their development studios. Including Nakagawa from WOW Entertainment and Mizuguchi. Yu Suzuki formed his own studio, Digital Rex, but within Sega. The development studios merged back into Sega on July 1 of 2004. Visual Concepts was sold to Take Two Interactive in 2005.

2000–2002

2003–2004

2005–2008 
In 2005 a new structure of game development was announced, after Sega became a subsidiary of Sega Sammy Holdings, and was under new management, with Hajime Satomi from Sammy Corporation at the top. The Consumer Business Group Division contained the Global Entertainment R&D and New Entertainment R&D departments, which were divided into six departments, each focusing on something different, such as network, sports, cinematic and character based games. Particularly the Yakuza / Like a Dragon games by the New Entertainment department already became a franchise for Sega in 2006, and they were motivated to develop it into a character brand similarly to Sonic the Hedgehog, Mushiking and Love & Berry. According to the now former manager Hisashi Suzuki, the Like a Dragon series was only possible due to the experience of Shenmue, and it also inherited elements of the SpikeOut arcade games. Next generation console development with PlayStation 3 exclusives Ryū ga Gotoku Kenzan! by NE and Valkyria Chronicles by GE2, and the multi-platform Sonic the Hedgehog 2006 by Sonic Team, also became a focus. Sega Europe president Mike Hayes said that Japanese origin IP became less popular around 2004, with Sega America president Simon Jeffery showing a similar sentiment. Specifically there was motivation to be seen less like just like another Japanese company by Sega of America, with them being more picky what to bring over from the Japanese studios since 2005. This was a conscious decision on Japanese management.

Trading card arcade games continued to be successful for Sega, with the latest example being Sangokushi Taisen, being developed by developers previously engaged in console games such as Sakura Wars. Sega also showcased the Lindbergh arcade board along with Virtua Fighter 5, Virtua Tennis 3 and The House of the Dead 4, which was the first arcade board to be based on PC architecture. Virtua Fighter 5 and Virtua Tennis 3 were both ported to consoles, however only the 360 versions had online play. The DS versions of Mushiking, Love & Berry and Dinosaur King were released, and particularly Love & Berry was successful as it became the first million-seller for Sega in Japan since Virtua Fighter 2. Tastes for arcade games changed on both sides of the world with Yoshimoto saying that potential new employees mentioned in interviews that the newer arcade games with flat panel card readers are the reasons for joining Sega, rather than machines like the R-360. Large driving game cabinets are not as appealing to the Japanese youth anymore and are more popular overseas. Western arcades became focused on casual players, while core players remained in Asia. Which motivated Sega to establish a development to develop games that better suit the western market, called Sega Amusements Europe.

Yuji Naka left during this period in 2006 with Yu Suzuki following in 2011.

2009–2017 
Sega management had high expectations for Nagoshi to develop a worldwide hit after the successful Yakuza series, which eventually became Binary Domain. Similarly the developers behind Tsukurou sports management franchise and the Phantasy Star series had a desire to aim for worldwide development, much like the developers behind the Sonic the Hedgehog, Super Monkey Ball and Mario & Sonic games. Binary Domain was not very successful, which made team reflect keep making authentic Japanese games rather than being anything else. Games for smartphones became a huge focus, particular with the keywords free to play and cross play. Sega learned from its experience from Kingdom Conquest which it translated to Samurai & Dragons for PlayStation Vita. Particularly Phantasy Star Online 2 was very much developed to be multi-platform with the addition of the PC platform and Vita, it also having versions available on iOS and Android. Arcade staff also began developing for smartphones with Alexandria Bloodshow and Samurai Bloodshow, which lead to Chain Chronicle, a successful earner for Sega. AM2 also began to develop smartphone games with Soul Reverse Zero. The market in North America and Europe was seen as very "tough", with Sega taking sight on the wider Asian market instead. Sega Europe announced that they will focus on fewer franchises, as well as the mobile and PC platforms. Atlus became part of Sega in 2013, with the acquisition of Atlus USA being finalized in 2016. Atlus USA made it possible to localize very Japanese games Yakuza and Hatsune Miku: Project DIVA to the western market. With the new policy of increasing localized titles, the "bridge team" was founded in 2017, to better support communication between Sega of America and Sega of Japan.

According to AM2 developer Makoto Osaki, Sega shifted its focus to internet games in the arcades rather than huge cabinets after server maintenance costs went down. Profits for arcade games were still higher than for console, mobile and PC games all the way to the fiscal year of 2014. Border Break became a huge success being supported for many years in arcades. Music games was another area of success for Sega with Hatsune Miku: Project Diva Arcade and Maimai, both of which received many updates. Ports of arcade games were developed primarily as downloadable games for PlayStation 3 and Xbox 360 with Virtua Fighter 5: Final Showdown, Daytona USA and After Burner Climax, among others.

2018–present 

The COVID-19 pandemic caused Sega to restructure their arcade business and place some of its developers onto console and smartphone games. Sega plans to release "Super Game", a framework of game development that has the following requirements: online, IP utilization, multi-platform, multi-language, simultaneous worldwide release and AAA. According to Sega Sammy CEO Haruki Satomi, Lost Judgment and Phantasy Star Online 2: New Genesis are first steps into fullfilling this framework. Additionally this Super Game development team will be a hybrid of developers that were previously involved in console, mobile and arcade games that eventually will add up to several hundred people. Unreal Engine 5 will be used, with Unreal Engine 4 already being used prior by other development teams. First by the arcade divisions, and then Ryu Ga Gotoku Studio with its remake of Like A Dragon: Ishin!. In terms of IP utilzation it is planned to resurrect past IP for these projects. Virtua Fighter 5: Ultimate Showdown and the 2019 Sakura Wars game are examples of this.

Nagoshi and Daisuke Sato left Ryu Ga Gotoku Studio in 2021.

Related companies 
These are companies founded by former employees of Sega

Acquired/founded studios

Former studios

See also 

 Lists of Sega games

References

 
Sega
Sega